

345001–345100 

|-bgcolor=#f2f2f2
| colspan=4 align=center | 
|}

345101–345200 

|-bgcolor=#f2f2f2
| colspan=4 align=center | 
|}

345201–345300 

|-bgcolor=#f2f2f2
| colspan=4 align=center | 
|}

345301–345400 

|-bgcolor=#f2f2f2
| colspan=4 align=center | 
|}

345401–345500 

|-bgcolor=#f2f2f2
| colspan=4 align=center | 
|}

345501–345600 

|-bgcolor=#f2f2f2
| colspan=4 align=center | 
|}

345601–345700 

|-id=648
| 345648 Adyendre ||  || Endre Ady (1877–1919) was a poet, journalist, short story writer, and one of Hungary's greatest lyric poets. He is best known for his daring works celebrating love, but he also wrote religious and revolutionary poems. His expression was radical in form, language and content. || 
|}

345701–345800 

|-id=762
| 345762 Jacquescoeur ||  || Jacques Cœur (c. 1395–1456), was a French merchant and government official, who initiated regular trade routes between France and the Levant (Eastern Mediterranean). || 
|}

345801–345900 

|-id=842
| 345842 Alexparker ||  || Alex H. Parker (born 1987), an American astronomer and co-discoverer of minor planets (uncredited as of 2017) || 
|-id=868
| 345868 Halicarnassus ||  || The Mausoleum at Halicarnassus, built 353-350 BCE, was the tomb of Mausolus, a governor in the Achaemenid Empire. It was one of the seven wonders of the ancient world. || 
|-id=871
| 345871 Xuguangxian ||  || Xu Guangxian (1920–2015), an academician of the Chinese Academy of Science, developed the theory of counter-current cascade extraction, which is widely used in rare-earth separation. (Xu Guangxian is also known as Kwang-hsien Hsu.) || 
|}

345901–346000 

|-id=971
| 345971 Marktorrence ||  || Mark H. Torrence (born 1952), an American planetary scientist and contributor to several NASA missions || 
|-id=972
| 345972 Rufin ||  || Jean-Christophe Rufin (born 1952) is a French doctor, diplomat, historian, globetrotter and novelist. He is the president of Action Against Hunger, was one of the earliest members of Médecins Sans Frontières, and is a member of the Académie Française. || 
|}

References 

345001-346000